The 2009–10 NBL season was the 32nd season for the Wollongong Hawks in the NBL. After Gujarat NRE provided a financial guarantee, the Hawks were eligible to enter the eight team competition. From almost not being a part of the competition to becoming runners-up, was a great achievement.

Roster

Regular season

Standings

See also
2009-10 NBL season

References

External links
Official Site of the Hawks

Illawarra Hawks seasons
2009–10 NBL season by team
2009–10 NBL season
2009–10 in Australian basketball